To motivate is to provide motivation, a reason or incentive for a particular behavior.

Motivate may also refer to:

 Motivate (company), an American company that services bicycle sharing systems
 Motivate Canada, a non-profit youth organization
 Motivate Media Group, a media company based in Dubai, United Arab Emirates
 "Motivate", a 2018 song by Little Mix from LM5

See also
 Motiv8 (disambiguation)
 Motivation (disambiguation)
 Motive (disambiguation)